The following is a list of members of the New Zealand Liberal Party who served in the New Zealand House of Representatives. The New Zealand Liberal Party was formalised in 1891 but had existed informally since the lead up to the 1890 general election. All members are listed up until the founding of the New Zealand National Party in 1936. From 1922 onwards the Liberal party received several cosmetic name changes; Progressive Liberal Labour Party (1922), "National" Party (1925) and finally United Party (1928). Only the final name change was successful. United MPs are included in this list.

Notes
†:Died in office

Sources
Appendices to the Journals of the House of Representatives, H33 and/or E9, various years. E9's since 1994 are available here.

Liberal MPs